Laqodexbinə is a village in the municipality of Yuxarı Tala in the Zaqatala Rayon of Azerbaijan.

References

Populated places in Zaqatala District